Rashtreeya Vidyalaya Pre University College is a pre university college located in the Jayanagar., India.

References

Pre University colleges in Karnataka